John Truax (February 12, 1877 – May 14, 1930) was an American politician in the state of Washington. He served in the Washington House of Representatives from 1913 to 1915. Truax died in 1930 in an accident in which he drowned after driving his car off of a ferry into the river in Richland, Washington.

References

Republican Party members of the Washington House of Representatives
People from Calhoun County, Michigan
1877 births
1930 deaths